Neagu is a Romanian-language name.

The name is related to Neagoe or Neagoie, a Romanian surname of Bulgarian origin - a variation of the medieval male Bulgarian name Няголь (Niagolь), modern Niagol. The name is derived from the Old Bulgarian and Old Slavic word neaga (care, nurture) and means "caretaker", someone who takes good care of those around him.

One of the oldest attestations of Neagoe as a given name is Neagoe Basarab, Voivode (Prince) of Wallachia between 1512 and 1521, from the old princely family of Basarab (probably of cumanic origin).

People with the surname
Alexandru Cătălin Neagu (born 1993), Romanian professional footballer
Alexandru Neagu (1948–2010), Romanian footballer
Andreas Neagu (born 1985), German-born Romanian bobsledder
Cristian Neagu (born 1980), Romanian retired footballer and manager
Cristina Neagu (born 1988), Romanian professional handballer
Dragoș Neagu (born 1967), retired Romanian rower
George Neagu (born 1985), Romanian professional footballer
Ionuț Neagu (born 1989), Romanian professional footballer
Marian Neagu (born 1991), Romanian professional footballer
Paul Neagu (1938–2004), British-Romanian artist
Răzvan Neagu (born 1987), Romanian former football player
Theodor Anton Neagu (born 1932), Romanian micropaleontologist & stratigrapher
Traian Neagu (born 1987), Romanian sprint canoeist

People with the given name
Neagu Bratu (born 1935), Romanian former sports shooter
Neagu Djuvara (born 1916), Romanian historian, essayist, philosopher, journalist, novelist and diplomat
Neagu Rădulescu (1912–1972), Romanian prose writer and caricaturist

See also 
Neagoe

Romanian-language surnames
Romanian masculine given names